Hackett may refer to:

People
Hackett (surname)

Places
Australia
 Hackett, Australian Capital Territory
 Hackett Terrace in Marryatville, South Australia

Canada
 Hackett River, a tributary of the Sheslay River in the Cassiar Land District of British Columbia
 Hackett (township), unincorporated territory of Lac-Masketsi, Quebec
 Lake Hackett (Mékinac), lake located in the administrative region of Mauricie

United States
 Hackett, Arkansas
 Hackett, Wisconsin

Businesses
 Hackett (automobile), an American car produced 1916–1919
 Hackett London, a British men's clothing company
 Hackett Publishing Company, a book publisher based in Indianapolis, Indiana
 Hackett's Nursery (1850–?), plant nursery in Marryatville, South Australia

See also 
 Hacket
 Hackettstown, New Jersey